UEFA European Under-21 Championship 2011 was the 18th staging of UEFA's European Under-21 Championship. The final tournament was hosted by Denmark between 11 and 25 June 2011.

The Danish bid was chosen by UEFA's Executive Committee on 10 December 2008 in Nyon, Switzerland. This bid defeated the other bid from Israel.

Qualification for the final tournament took place between March 2009 and October 2010.

This competition also acted as a qualifier for the 2012 Summer Olympics, as 3 teams qualified.

Spain won their third title after defeating Switzerland 2–0 in the final.

Host selection

The organisation of the event was initially contested by only two bids: Denmark and Israel. The bids were submitted on 15 June 2008.

The bids were inspected between June and September 2008, and a report was given to the National Team Competition Committee in October. The committee discussed the bids on 27 November 2008 and issued a recommendation to the UEFA Executive Committee, who decided on 10 December 2008 that Denmark would host the finals.

Qualification

The draw for the 2011 UEFA European Under-21 Championship qualifying round took place in Århus on 4 February 2009. The qualifying draw determined the makeup of ten groups. Ten groups were formed in the qualifying draw including two sections of six sides and eight of five, as teams chase 7 finals places alongside host Denmark. The seeding pots are formed on the basis of former performance in the tournament. All groups contained one nation from the first five pots and two sections also included a team from Pot 6. The six European federations that have qualified for the 2009 FIFA U-20 World Cup (Germany, Italy, Czech Republic, Hungary, Spain and England) were each drawn in one of the six groups of five teams.

2012 Summer Olympics and Great Britain team

The tournament was used as the European qualifying tournament for the 2012 Summer Olympics in London with the top teams qualifying for London 2012.  The four British federations entered the qualification process as single entities, but are not eligible to qualify for the Olympics. If one or more British teams had qualified for the Championship, and to pass the first round, play-off games would be played (like in 2007 when Italy and Portugal faced for the last place in the Olympics). As Great Britain is the host nation for the 2012 Olympics, it is entitled to an automatic place in the competition. This caused controversy as in the Olympics, Great Britain competes as a single unified country, as opposed to the four individual nations in football. Scotland, Wales and Northern Ireland all logged public objections to the idea of a GB team at the Olympics, fearing that it would jeopardise their independent status in UEFA and FIFA. A compromise was reached in 2009 whereby England would field a team for the tournament, while the other three would not participate, but not object to England's involvement.

List of qualified teams
The following 8 teams qualified for the 2011 UEFA European Under-21 Championship

Venues
The tournament venues were all located in Jutland, at already existing stadiums in Aarhus, Aalborg, Herning and Viborg.

On 20 September 2010 it was announced that Aarhus Stadion would host the final. Further Aalborg Stadion was confirmed as the venue for the opening match and the eventual Olympic qualifying play-off. The semifinals were played at Herning Stadium and Viborg Stadion. It was also published that Denmark would play all of its matches in Aalborg and Aarhus.

Format

The final tournament consisted of two groups of four, with the top two from each progressing to the semifinals where it becomes a knockout competition. In the finals held a year before a summer Olympic Games the championship also serves as qualification for the Olympic Football Tournament.

Players were eligible for the 2011 UEFA European Under-21 Championship if they were born on or later than 1 January 1988.

Seeding
The draw for the final tournament took place on 9 November 2010 at Aalborg Congress & Culture Centre in Aalborg.

Similar to former tournaments, the games in each group are to be held at just two stadia. For the draw, the finalists were divided into three seeding pots, based on average points per game in the qualifying phase, with each group having one team from pot 1 and 2, and two teams from pot 3. Denmark, as hosts, were seeded first automatically.

Squads

Squads for the 2011 Euro U-21 Championship consisted of 23 players, as in the previous tournament in 2009. Only players born on or after 1 January 1988 were eligible to play.

Referees
In April 2011 UEFA published a list of referees, assistant referees and fourth officials to officiate at the tournament. All of the referees are either Premier Category 1-referees or Category 2-referees, respectively the second highest and third highest tier of international referees. All referees are appointed because they are deemed to be future elite referees, thus they are all between 31 and 38 years old and therefore adhere to the U21 philosophy of being the tournament of the stars of tomorrow.

Referees
Robert Schörgenhofer (Austria)
Paolo Tagliavento (Italy)
Marijo Strahonja (Croatia)
Aleksandar Stavrev (Macedonia)
Milorad Mažić (Serbia)
Markus Strömbergsson (Sweden)

Fourth officials
Kenn Hansen (Denmark)
Liran Liany (Israel)

Tiebreakers
As in Under-21 Euro 2009: If two or more teams are equal on points on completion of the group matches, the following criteria are applied to determine the rankings.
 Higher number of points obtained in the group matches played among the teams in question
 Superior goal difference from the group matches played among the teams in question
 Higher number of goals scored in the group matches played among the teams in question
 If, after applying criteria 1 to 4 to several teams, two or more teams still have an equal ranking, the criteria 1 to 4 will be reapplied to determine the ranking of these teams. If this procedure does not lead to a decision, criteria 5 and 6 will apply
 Results of all group matches:
 Superior goal difference
 Higher number of goals scored
 Fair play conduct
 Drawing of lots

Group stage 
The draw took place on 9 November 2010 in Aalborg, Denmark.
The first round saw the eight teams divided into two groups of four teams. Each group was a round-robin, where each teams plays one game against every other team in their group. Teams were awarded three points for a win, one point for a draw and no points for a defeat. The teams finishing first and second in each group qualified for the semifinals.

Group A 
In group A tie-breakers were needed to break down the three-point tie with Belarus, Denmark and Iceland. Belarus advanced due to a better goal difference in the matches between those three.

All times are UTC+2.

Group B 

All times are UTC+2.

Knockout stage

Knockout map

Semifinals 

Winners qualify for 2012 Summer Olympics.

Olympic play-off 

Winner qualifies for 2012 Summer Olympics.

Final

Goalscorers
5 goals
 Adrián

3 goals
 Admir Mehmedi

2 goals

 Andrey Varankow
 Bořek Dočkal
 Ander Herrera
 Juan Mata
 Danny Welbeck

1 goal

 Dzmitry Baha
 Egor Filipenko
 Maksim Skavysh
 Jan Chramosta
 Tomáš Pekhart
 Christian Eriksen
 Nicolai Jørgensen
 Bashkim Kadrii
 Birkir Bjarnason
 Kolbeinn Sigþórsson
 Hjörtur Logi Valgarðsson
 Thiago
 Jeffrén
 Innocent Emeghara
 Frank Feltscher
 Fabian Frei
 Xherdan Shaqiri
 Maksym Bilyi

Team of the Tournament
The UEFA Technical Team was charged with naming a squad composed of the 23 best players over the course of the tournament. The group of nine analysts watched every game at the tournament before making their decision after the final. Spain, with seven, had most players in the team.

UEFA Team of the Tournament

Medal table and Olympic qualifiers 
 Spain, Switzerland and Belarus qualify for the Olympic games finals.
See Football at the 2012 Summer Olympics

Media

Broadcasting

References

External links

 UEFA.com – UEFA Under-21 Championship
  Official Danish FA website

 
2011
Europe
2010–11 in European football
UEFA European Under-21 Championship
2011
June 2011 sports events in Europe
2011 in youth association football